Paolo Pescetto (Genova, 12 January 1995) is an Italian rugby union player.
His usual position is as a Fly-Half and he currently plays for Colorno.

For 2019–20 Pro14 season, he was named as Additional Player for Zebre. In 2020–21 Pro14 and 2021–22 United Rugby Championship seasons he played for Zebre. It was announced on 6th January 2022 that he was leaving Zebre to join Colorno.

In 2016 and 2021 Pescetto was named in the Emerging Italy squad for the Nations Cup and for the 2021 end-of-year rugby union internationals

References

External links 
It's Rugby France Profile
Eurosport Profil

1995 births
Living people
Italian rugby union players
Rugby union fly-halves
RC Narbonne players
Rugby Calvisano players
Zebre Parma players
Rugby Colorno players